Eleleis is a genus of spiders in the family Prodidominae. It was first described by Eugène Louis Simon in 1893, and is only found in southern Africa.

Species 
 it contains nine species:

 Eleleis crinita Simon, 1893 – South Africa
 Eleleis etosha Rodrigues & Rheims, 2020 – Namibia
 Eleleis haddadi Rodrigues & Rheims, 2020 – South Africa
 Eleleis himba Rodrigues & Rheims, 2020 – Namibia
 Eleleis leleupi Rodrigues & Rheims, 2020 – South Africa
 Eleleis limpopo Rodrigues & Rheims, 2020 – Zambia, South Africa
 Eleleis luderitz Rodrigues & Rheims, 2020 – Namibia
 Eleleis okavango Rodrigues & Rheims, 2020 – Namibia, Botswana
 Eleleis solitaria Rodrigues & Rheims, 2020 – Cape Verde

See also
 List of Prodidominae species

References

Prodidominae